The Iron Horse was a hamburger restaurant in Seattle, Washington, established in 1971 by Charlie Maslow. Located in Pioneer Square, food orders at the restaurant were delivered by model trains which moved along a track that circled the dining area. The Iron Horse closed in 2000, its then-owners citing increasing rents created by the dot com boom, combined with a loss of event business occasioned by the demolition of the Kingdome, as reasons for its shuttering.

After the closure of the Iron Horse, the subsequent closing of another train-themed Seattle restaurant – Andy's Diner – prompted the Seattle Weekly's Mike Seely to eulogize that in "the sweet hereafter ... the Big Engineer in the sky makes a choice between Andy's and the Iron Horse".

The restaurant was located at 311 3rd Avenue South, near the King Street Station.

See also
 Beth's Cafe
 List of defunct restaurants of the United States
 List of hamburger restaurants

References

External links
 Video of the interior of the Iron Horse in 1998

1971 establishments in Washington (state)
2000 disestablishments in Washington (state)
Defunct restaurants in Seattle
Defunct hamburger restaurants
Restaurants established in 1971
Restaurants disestablished in 2000
Pioneer Square, Seattle
Railway-themed restaurants
Hamburger restaurants in the United States